Jamie is a given name.

Jamie may also refer to:

Music
 Jamie Records, an American record label
 The Jamies, an American doo wop group
 Jamie, a 2021 album by B Wise
 "Jamie", a 1961 song by Eddie Holland
 "Jamie", a 1984 song by Ray Parker Jr.
 "Jamie", a 1994 B-side to the Weezer song "Buddy Holly"

People with the surname
Kathleen Jamie (born 1962), Scottish poet
Poppy Jamie (born 1990), British entrepreneur and former television presenter

Other uses
Jamie (TV series), a 1953-54 American sitcom
Jamie, a 2020 short film by Esmé Creed-Miles
Jamie, the title character of Everybody's Talking About Jamie, a 2017 West End musical

See also
 Jaime
 Jaimie
 Jamey
 Jamy (disambiguation)